St.Teresa's High School (STHS) is a government aided, private co-educational day school, located at Charni Road in Mumbai, India. The institution was founded in 1843, and present day school building was established in 1924.

The school caters to pupils from kindergarten up to class X and the medium of instruction is English. The school is affiliated to the Archdiocesan Board of Education, Mumbai, which conducts the Maharashtra State Board of Secondary and Higher Secondary Education examinations at the close of class X.

Campus site and layout
The school building is divided into three buildings. The school has three playgrounds: a mud ground, stone ground and the quadrant. The main school building has three floors. The ground floor comprises: the classrooms of Junior Kindergarten (Jr. KG) and Senior Kindergarten (Sr. KG), and Standard I. The assembly hall, school church, school office, computer lab, drawing room, the MDR A.V. Hall, Manager's Office, and Head Mistress's Office. The first floor includes: the classrooms for Standard II, III, IV & standard X division B along with the laboratories. standard X division B was Shifted on 2nd Floor in 2019. The second floor includes: the classrooms for standard VIII, IX, standard X division B along with the Supervisor's Office, the School Library. formerly G.M. Room, the staff room, and the Principal's Quarter. The third floor includes: the classrooms for standard V, VI, VII, and staff room.

Admissions and curriculum

Admissions
The admission notice for Junior kindergarten is put up in January. During the admission procedure, preference is given to Catholics and siblings of former students.

Curriculum
The school follows the Maharashtra State Board of Secondary and Higher Secondary Education syllabus. English is the medium of instruction; Hindi is taught as a second language, and Marathi, being the regional language, is taught as a third language.

The academic year which commences in June and concludes in April consists of two terms. The first term is from June till November and the second term is from November till April. Tests are conducted periodically and examinations are held at the end of every term. The courses of studies extend from kindergarten to class X, at the end of which students appear for the SSC Examinations. The school's students have consistently performed well at the SSC examinations and the school has maintained a 100% pass-rate.

Extracurricular activities
Emphasis is placed on extracurricular activities. Inter-house debates, elocution, dramatics and sporting competitions are also a part of the cultural lives of the older students. The school also takes part in science exhibitions and quizzes conducted.

House system
The objective of the house system is to foster a sense of collective responsibility and solidarity amongst students. The house system also serves as the centre of school life, with students from different houses often competing at sports and other co-curricular activities. Each house has their respective Students' Council member in-charge expected to fulfil his/her duties as instructed either by the management, or the school staff. The following are the houses present in the school along with their respective colours:

 Nehru  Gandhi  Tilak  Tagore.

Uniform
Boys from I-VII standards will wear white short sleeved shirts and beige short pants. Standard VIII-X boys wear beige long pants; girls wear beige six piece skirt, with white blouse. Regular black leather shoes are instructed as regular school wear. Ties and t-shirts are supplied in school. On P.E. days however, boys from the primary section wear black short pants and t-shirts of their respective houses; the same applies to girls however they wear black skirt. Boys and girls from higher standards wear black long pants and t-shirts with their respective house colours.

The St Teresa's Parent Teacher Association (P.T.A)
The P.T.A. aims towards at fostering cordial and friendly relations between the members of the staff and the parents of the students so that there is better understanding and co-operation between the home and the school. From each class, one parent is elected as the P.T.A. representative of that specific class.

Students' Council
The Head boy and Head girl are selected by the teachers from standard X. The assistant head boy and the assistant head girl are selected by the teachers from standard IX. Additionally four house captains for each house are selected. The captains are selected from standard. IX and the assistant captains are selected from standard. VIII.

List of scholarships

For all-round 
 The Sr. Cynthia Fernandes Scholarship for the best all round student -studies/activities/character (standard X).
 The Msgr. Eustance D'lima Scholarship for the deserving hardworking student of standard. X.
The Fr. Gerald Fernandes Sacerdotal Silver Jubilee Scholarship for the best all round student in studies/activities/character of standard IX.
Mr and Mrs C. G. Pratap scholarship to the best all-round student of the secondary school: standard V to X.

For Academics
The Miss Elizabeth Rowe Scholarship for a catholic student securing a first class and the highest among the Catholic students the SSC Board Exam.
The Rita Misquita Scholarship for the highest in English in standard X (S.S.C Exam).
The Yvette D'Sylva Scholarship for the highest marks in the S.S.C Examination.
The x-student Scholarship for Gen. Proficiency in standard. IX.
The Ex-student Scholarship for Gen. Proficiency in standard. VIII.
The Yvette Desa Scholarship for Gen. Proficiency in standard. VII.
The Cherylann Scholarship for Gen. Proficiency in standard. VI.
The Motiram Jaykar Scholarship for Gen. Proficiency in standard. V.
The Shridhar Vasant Nawathe Scholarship for Maths/Science in standard. V.
The Mr and Mrs Mathew V. D'Souza Scholarship to the student securing the highest in Mathematics in standard. IX.
The Fr. Roque Pereira Scholarship for a deserving Catholic student of standard. VIII who has secured 60% in the final exam.
The Isabel Fernandes Scholarship for a Catholic student securing the highest in Social Studies at the SSC Board Exam.

Culture
St Teresa's is a cosmopolitan school. The school imparts Christian values to the children. The Christmas concert is celebrated every December. A sports meet and a farewell party for students who are passing out of the institution are also held annually. The school stands for academic excellence, development of skills and character formation based on love of God and service of man as modelled on the person of Jesus Christ. As mentioned in the school diary, they believe in 'four steps to achievement,' namely, planing purposefully, prepare prayerfully, proceed positively, and pursue persistently. The school's vision is to achieve excellence for the student via team-work, and nurture them at every stage on the values of: determination, dedication, devotion, and discipline. 

The school also does holds some traditions to be maintained by all the students of the school; they are mentioned in the school diary. They are:

 To always be friends with one another and respectful towards elders—in and out of the school.
 To avoid vulgarity in talk and behaviour.
 To accept whatever work is assigned with joy and pride.
 To be courteous, and develop sportsmanship—like with officials and with opposing teams of different Houses.
 To respect the liberty and rights of other pupils.
 To learn and observe good manners everywhere.
 To only converse in English.

Gallery

See also
Education in India
Roman Catholic Archdiocese of Bombay
 List of schools in Mumbai

References
About St. Theresa School; Education Raft
St. Teresa High School, Mumbai; TVY.

External links

Government schools in India
Primary schools in India
Catholic secondary schools in India
Christian schools in Maharashtra
High schools and secondary schools in Mumbai
Educational institutions established in 1924
1924 establishments in India